Marie Mutsuki Mockett is an American novelist and memoirist.

Life 
Mockett was born to a Japanese mother and an American father and grew up speaking English, German and Japanese. Her mother's family owns a Buddhist temple in Tohoku Japan, 25 miles from the Fukushima Daichi nuclear power reactor. Her father's family owns a wheat farm in Nebraska. Mockett graduated from the Robert Louis Stevenson School in Pebble Beach, California  and Columbia University in 1992. Her novel, Picking Bones from Ash, was published in 2009 and short listed for the Paterson Prize. Her memoir, Where the Dead Pause and the Japanese Say Goodbye, was shortlisted for the PEN Open Award, the Northern California Book Award and was the Barnes a Noble Discover Pick. American Harvest, her third book, follows her travels through the American heartland in the company of evangelical harvesters and examines the rural and urban divide and won the 2020 Northern California Book Award for General Nonfiction. Her essays have appeared in Elle, The New York Times, and Salon.

Works

Fiction 
Picking Bones From Ash, Graywolf Press, 2009.

Nonfiction 
Where the Dead Pause, and the Japanese Say Goodbye, WW Norton, 2015. 
 American Harvest: God, Country, and Farming in the Heartland, Graywolf Press, 2020.

References 

Living people
American writers of Japanese descent
American women writers of Asian descent
Columbia College (New York) alumni
Year of birth missing (living people)